The 1999 Hart Council election took place on 6 May 1999 to elect members of Hart District Council in Hampshire, England. One third of the council was up for election and the council stayed under no overall control.

After the election, the composition of the council was
Conservative 16
Liberal Democrat 14
Independent 5

Election result

Ward results

References

1999
1999 English local elections
1990s in Hampshire